Cisne or Cisnes may refer to:

Cisne, Illinois
Cisne Branco
Cisne Rivera
Swan Islands, Falkland Islands (Islas del Cisne)
Swan Islands, Honduras  (Islas del Cisne)
Cisnes
Puerto Cisnes
Cisnes River

See also
Cisneros (disambiguation)